The seven-striped blind snake (Siagonodon septemstriatus) is a species of snake in the family Leptotyphlopidae. The species is native to northeastern South America.

Geographic range
S. septemstriatus is found in Bolivia, northern Brazil (Amazonas, Pará, Roraima), French Guiana, Guyana, Suriname, and southeastern Venezuela.

Habitat

Description
S. septemstriatus is yellowish, with seven black stripes along the dorsal scales.

Behavior
S. septemstriatus is terrestrial and fossorial.

Reproduction
S. septemstriatus is oviparous.

References

Further reading
Freiberg MA (1982). Snakes of South America. Hong Kong: T.F.H. Publications. 189 pp. . (Leptotyphlops septemstriatus, p. 118).
Mertens R (1925). "Der Fundort von Leptotyphlops septemstriatus Schneider ". Senckenbergiana 7 (3/4): 78–79. (in German).
Rivas GA, Molina CR, Ugueto GN, Barros TR, Barrio-Amorós CL, Kok PJR (2012) "Reptiles of Venezuela: an updated and commented checklist". Zootaxa 3211: 1–64.
Schneider JG (1801). Historiae Amphibiorum naturalis et literariae Fasciculus Secundus continens Crocodilos, Scincos, Chamaesauras, Boas, Pseudoboas, Elapes, Angues, Amphisbaenas et Caecilias. Jena: F. Frommann. vi + 374 pp. + Plates I–II. (Typhlopes septemstriatus, new species, p. 341). (in Latin).

Siagonodon
Reptiles described in 1801